Andrés Manjón y Manjón (Sargentes de la Lora, 30 November 1846 – 10 July 1923) was a Spanish priest and educator who founded the Escuelas del Ave-María (Schools of Ave Maria) in Granada. He was ordained to the priesthood on 16 June 1886. Pope Francis named him as Venerable on 23 November 2020.

References

External links
 http://www.escuelasdelavemaria.org/PATRONATOAM/Bienvenida.html

1846 births
1923 deaths
Spanish educators
Spanish Roman Catholic priests
Venerated Catholics by Pope Francis